Dan Goldfuss (born December 28 1976) is an Israeli Brigadier general (Tat-Aluf) who commands the Fire Formation (98th Paratroopers Division).

He previously served as Commander of Gadsar Nahal, Shayetet 13, 931st Onyx Battalion, Nahal Brigade, Infantry Corps and the 98th Paratroopers Division.

Biography 
Goldfuss was born and raised in Jerusalem. He enlisted in the IDF in March 1995, and volunteered for Shayetet 13. He completed the warrior course training in the Shaytet, and took part in the fighting in southern Lebanon, among other things he was part of the rescue force in the Ansariya ambush. After that he went to the infantry officers' course. At the end of the course he returned to Shayetet 13 and was appointed plattoon commander. He later served as the commander of a fighter unit in the Shayetet, among other things during Operation Protective Shield. He then moved to the Nahal Brigade and was appointed commander of the Gadsar Nahal between 2002-2004, and led it in the fight against Palestinian terrorism in the second intifada. For the manner in which he commanded it, he was awarded the Aluf Citation by Moshe Kaplinsky.

In 2007 he was promoted to the rank of lieutenant colonel (Sgan-Aluf) and appointed platoon commander in Shayetet 13, and led it, among other things, in Operation Cast Lead, he served in this position until 2009. Later he was appointed commander of the 931st Onyx Battalion between the years 2009-2011. In July 2015 he was appointed commander of the 226th reserve Paratroopers Battalion and at the same time commander of a course in the company commanders and battalion commanders course, and served in his positions until March 2017. On March 2, 2017 he was appointed commander of the Nahal Brigade, and served in this position until August 15, 2019. On September 16, 2019 he was promoted to the rank of brigadier general (Tat-Aluf) and was appointed head of Infantry Corps, a position in which he served until July 19, 2021. At the end of his position, he went to study at Harvard University in the United States. On September 21, 2022, he was appointed commander of the fire formation.

Awards and decorations 
Dan Goldfuss was awarded three campaign ribbons for his service during three conflicts, as well as one Aluf Citation.

Personal life 
Goldfuss has a wife and 4 kids. Has a bachelor's degree in politics, government and Middle Eastern studies from the Reichman University, and a master's degree in political science from the University of Haifa.

References 

1976 births
Israeli generals
Jewish military personnel
Living people
People from Jerusalem